The Doubles luge competition at the 1994 Winter Olympics in Lillehammer was held on 18 February, at Lillehammer Olympic Bobsleigh and Luge Track. Prior to these Games, the International Luge Federation changed the doubles from a men's event to an open event, allowing men and women to race together. However, no women competed in this event during these Games.

Results

References

Luge at the 1994 Winter Olympics